Eliézio Santos Santana or simply Eliézio (born March 31, 1987 in Salvador, Bahia) is a Brazilian central defender.

Honours
Urawa Red
 Emperor's Cup: 2005

Brazil U20
South American Youth Championship: 2007

 Itumbiara
 Campeonato Goiano: 2008

 Interporto
 Campeonato Tocantinense: 2017

External links
 
 
 
 
 CBF

1987 births
Living people
Brazilian footballers
Brazilian expatriate footballers
Expatriate footballers in Japan
Brazilian expatriate sportspeople in Japan
Expatriate footballers in Portugal
Brazilian expatriate sportspeople in Portugal
Brazil youth international footballers
Association football defenders
Brazil under-20 international footballers
J1 League players
J3 League players
Campeonato Brasileiro Série A players
Primeira Liga players
Liga Portugal 2 players
Campeonato Brasileiro Série D players
Urawa Red Diamonds players
Cruzeiro Esporte Clube players
FC Porto players
U.D. Leiria players
Itumbiara Esporte Clube players
Esporte Clube Democrata players
América Futebol Clube (Teófilo Otoni) players
Esporte Clube São José players
Esporte Clube Avenida players
Esporte Clube Pelotas players
Vera Cruz Futebol Clube players
Nacional Futebol Clube players
União Recreativa dos Trabalhadores players
Sinop Futebol Clube players
Concórdia Atlético Clube players
Colo Colo de Futebol e Regatas players
Marília Atlético Clube players
Interporto Futebol Clube players
Fukushima United FC players
Sportspeople from Salvador, Bahia